The mudbrick stamp or brick seal of Mesopotamia are impression or stamp seals made upon bricks or mudbrick. The inscribed seal is in mirror reverse on the 'mold', mostly with cuneiform inscriptions, and the foundation mudbricks are often part of the memorializing of temples, or other structures, as part of a "foundation deposit", a common honoring or invocation to a specific god or protector.

Example mudbrick seal

The brick stamping mold for Sin-Iddinam of Larsa is housed in the Louvre. It is a nearly complete mold, with an inscription in cuneiform to the Sun God, Utu, as a foundation deposit for the god's temple, the Ebbabar.

Gallery

Ancient Roman bricks

External links
High Res photo of stamp from Mesopotamia; Article
Dig site with stamped mudbrick

Bricks
Ancient Near and Middle East clay objects